Sir John Oliver Frank Kingman KCB FRS (born 24 April 1969) has been Chair of Legal & General PLC since 2016. From June he will also Chair Barclays UK, the ring-fenced retail bank of Barclays PLC.  He was previously Chair of Tesco Bank.

He is Deputy Chair (and twice served as Acting Chair) of the National Gallery. 

He is a former Second Permanent Secretary to HM Treasury.

From 2016-21, he was the first Chair of UK Research and Innovation, which oversees Government science and innovation funding of about £8bn a year. He was elected an Honorary Fellow of the Royal Society in 2021, "for his unwavering support for science throughout his career".

In 2018, he undertook a highly critical review of the Financial Reporting Council, recommending wholesale reform of the FRC and ending self-regulation of the major audit firms.

Education
He was a Queen’s Scholar at Westminster School and a Casberd Scholar at St John's College, Oxford, where he took a 1st class degree in Modern History; he is now an Honorary Fellow.

Career 

Early in his career (1995-97) Kingman was a Financial Times Lex columnist. He also worked in the Chief Executive's office at BP, 1997-98.

Kingman was closely involved with the response to the 2007-09 financial crisis. He handled nationalisation of Northern Rock, and led negotiations with RBS, Lloyds and HBOS on their £37bn recapitalisation. He was the first chief executive of UK Financial Investments, which managed the Government's bank shareholdings.

Whilst at the Treasury, Kingman was responsible for selling £16bn of Lloyds shares, the first RBS share sale, and the largest-ever UK privatisation (£13bn of mortgage assets). Kingman led on liberalising the annuity market and creating the National Infrastructure Commission; he negotiated Greater Manchester's devolution deal, introducing an elected Mayor. Earlier, he was responsible for a fundamental overhaul of the UK competition regime (2001 Enterprise Act), and introducing the Highly Skilled Migrants’ Programme. He was particularly involved with science funding, working on five spending reviews which prioritised science and in 2004 leading the cross-Government 10 year science and innovation framework. From 2003-06, he was a board Director of the European Investment Bank.

From 2010-2012, Kingman was Global co-head of the Financial Institutions Group at Rothschild.

Affiliations

Kingman is a World Fellow of Yale University and a member of the Trilateral Commission. He chaired the judges for the 2017 Wolfson Economics Prize. 

He was a Trustee of the Royal Opera House, 2014-21, and has been a member of the Prime Minister's Council for Science and Technology, the Global Advisory Committee for the Centre for Corporate Reputation, Oxford University, and the Development Board for the £37m renewal of St-Martin-in-the-Fields.

Personal life 

Kingman is the son of the mathematician Sir John Frank Charles Kingman FRS. 

His partner is Diana Gerald, CEO of the charity BookTrust. They live in central London with their daughter.

References 

1969 births
Living people
People educated at The Dragon School
People educated at Westminster School, London
Alumni of St John's College, Oxford
British civil servants
Civil servants in HM Treasury
Second Permanent Secretaries of HM Treasury
Investment bankers